Antanimbaribe is a rural commune  in Madagascar. It belongs to the northern part of the district of Kandreho, which is a part of Betsiboka.  It borders the regions of Boeny and Melaky.

The Kasijy Reserve is situated in this municipality.

References

Populated places in Betsiboka